Jan Mosdorf (30 May 1904 – 11 October 1943), was a Polish right-wing politician, director of the nationalist organization All-Polish Youth (Młodzież Wszechpolska, MW) and member of the far-right political party National Radical Camp (ONR). He also worked as a publicist, using the pseudonym Andrzej Witkowski. In 1943, Mosdorf was killed in the Auschwitz concentration camp.

Biography

Mosdorf was born in Warsaw. He associated himself with the National Democratic movement (founded by Roman Dmowski) some time in 1926. Two years later, he completed his philosophy studies, earning an M.A. degree (later, he also earned a PhD in philosophy, writing about works of Auguste Comte, under supervision of Prof. Władysław Tatarkiewicz). As a student, he was a member of several right-wing youth organizations. He wrote articles for nationalist magazines, always claiming that Germany was Poland’s main enemy and that Poland should gain control over the Western part of Upper Silesia and Masuria.

In 1928, during the IV Congress of the MW, which took place in Lwów, he was elected director of the organization. Later on, he had to hide for some time because he was a member of the ONR, and the government had incarcerated several activists of the organization in the Bereza Kartuska Prison.

We [Polish nationalists] are not fascists, nor Hitlerites, for we are a native Polish movement, independent of foreign views. Additionally, we do not see ourselves as fascists or Nazis due to the many weaknesses, and even sins, these movements carry. These are not examples we would want to follow.- Jan Mosdorf "Wczoraj i Jutro", 1938

In late 1939, after the Polish September Campaign, he returned to the underground National Party. He was one of leaders of the party, and he helped with the creation of the anti-Nazi paramilitary units known as Narodowa Organizacja Wojskowa. In July 1940, Mosdorf was arrested and placed in Gestapo's infamous Pawiak prison. On 6 January 1941, he was sent to Auschwitz. While there, Mosdorf met his friend from ONR, Bolesław Świderski, whose support was crucial. 
 
Until then, Mosdorf had regarded Jews as enemies of Poland and the Polish nation. After surviving typhus, however, he changed his attitudes.
Professor Irina Livezeanu from University of Pittsburgh wrote: "Mosdorf did everything in his power to help the Jews in the Auschwitz camp, and he died together with the Jews."

On 25 September 1943, Mosdorf was placed in the Pavilion XI, and on 11 October he was executed with a group of other inmates. His symbolic tomb is located at the Powązkowski Cemetery in Warsaw.

Works

Jan Mosdorf, "Wczoraj i Jutro", 1938 reprint Agencja Wydawniczo-Reklamowa "ARTE", 2005,

Bibliography

 Mateusz Kotas, "Jan Mosdorf. Filozof, ideolog, polityk" - 2007  
 Tadeusz Piotrowski, Poland's Holocaust, 1998
 Stefan Korboński, Jews Under Occupation, University of Pittsburgh

References

1904 births
1943 deaths
Politicians from Warsaw
People from Warsaw Governorate
National Party (Poland) politicians
Camp of Great Poland politicians
National Radical Camp politicians
Polish nationalists
Polish resistance members of World War II
Polish people who died in Auschwitz concentration camp
Politicians who died in Nazi concentration camps
Resistance members who died in Nazi concentration camps
Polish civilians killed in World War II
Burials at Powązki Cemetery